The 2008 1000 km of Monza was the second round of the 2008 Le Mans Series season.  It took place at the Autodromo Nazionale Monza, Italy, on 27 April 2008. This event was the last.

Monégasque driver Stéphane Ortelli was injured in an incident during the race in which his Oreca-Courage Le Mans prototype became airborne in the first chicane.  The car flipped several times, and Ortelli suffered a broken ankle. Ortelli's car narrowly missed hitting the #1 Audi R10 driven by Allan McNish. McNish had to weave his way through the debris of the crash.

Race results
Class winners in bold.  Cars failing to complete 70% of winner's distance marked as Not Classified (NC).

† - #76 IMSA Performance Matmut was disqualified after failing post-race technical inspection.  The car's airbox was found to be outside the regulations.

Statistics
 Pole Position - #7 Team Peugeot Total - 1:31.470
 Pole Position (LMP2) -  #34 Van Merksteijn Motorsport - 1:36.842
 Fastest Lap - #7 Team Peugeot Total - 1:32.449
 Average Speed - 201.019 km/h

References

External links
 Le Mans Series — 1000 km of Monza

Monza
6 Hours of Monza
Monza